Absalom Boston (1785–1855) was a United States mariner who was the first African-American captain to sail a whaleship, with an all-black crew, in 1822.

Biography
Absalom Boston was born in Nantucket, Massachusetts, to Seneca Boston, an African-American ex-slave father, and Thankful Micah, a Wampanoag Indian mother. His uncle, a slave named Prince Boston, was part of the crew of a 1770 whaling voyage, but refused to turn over his earnings to his white master. Instead, he went to court and won both his earnings and freedom, making him the first black slave to win his freedom in a U.S. jury trial.

Boston spent his early years working in the whaling industry. By the time he reached 20, he acquired enough money to purchase property in Nantucket. Ten years later, he obtained a license to open and operate a public inn.

In 1822, Boston became the captain of the Industry, a whaleship manned entirely with an African-American crew. The six-month journey returned with 70 barrels of whale oil and the entire crew intact.

Boston retired from the sea after the Industry returned to Nantucket from its historic voyage. He concentrated on becoming a business and community leader, and also ran for public office. Together with fellow captain, Edward Pompey, he led the Nantucket abolitionist movement. He was also a founding trustee of Nantucket's African Baptist Society, and the African Meeting House in Nantucket. In 1845, after his daughter Phebe Ann Boston was barred from attending a public school, he successfully brought a lawsuit against the Nantucket municipal government to integrate the public education system.

References 

1785 births
1855 deaths
African-American businesspeople
American people in whaling
Sea captains
People from Nantucket, Massachusetts
19th-century American businesspeople
Wampanoag people
American abolitionists
Activists from Massachusetts
Businesspeople from Massachusetts
Native American people from Massachusetts
19th-century Native Americans